The 2014 Colonial Athletic Association football season was the eight season of football for the Colonial Athletic Association (CAA) and part of the 2014 NCAA Division I FCS football season.  It was the first season for Elon in the CAA after being a member of the Southern Conference.  New Hampshire went undefeated conference play, winning the CAA with a record of 8–0.

Previous season
In 2013, the CAA played with 11 members, and were welcoming in Albany and Stony Brook to replace Georgia State and Old Dominion, who left for the FBS.  Maine won the conference with a record of 7–1 in conference, and was joined in the FCS Playoffs by New Hampshire and Towson.  Maine would receive the #5 seed in the playoffs, but be eliminated in their first game by New Hampshire.  New Hampshire would go on to the semifinals, and fall on the road to #1 seed North Dakota State.  Towson would earn the #7 seed, and go all the way to the National Championship game, only to fall to North Dakota State.

Head coaches
Greg Gattuso, Albany – 1st year
Dave Brock, Delaware – 2nd year
Rich Skrosky, Elon – 1st year
Everett Withers, James Madison – 1st year
Jack Cosgrove, Maine – 22nd year
Sean McDonnell, New Hampshire – 16th year
Jim Fleming, Rhode Island – 1st year
Danny Rocco, Richmond – 3rd year
Chuck Priore, Stony Brook – 9th year
Rob Ambrose, Towson – 6th year
Andy Talley, Villanova – 30th year
Jimmye Laycock, William & Mary – 35th year

Preseason poll results
First place votes in parentheses

Rankings

Regular season

All times Eastern time.

Rankings reflect that of the Sports Network poll for that week.

Week One

Players of the week:

Week Two

Players of the week:

Week Three

Players of the week:

Week Four

Players of the week:

Week Five

Players of the week:

Week Six

Players of the week:

Week Seven

Players of the week:

Week Eight

Players of the week:

Week Nine

Players of the week:

Week Ten

Players of the week:

Week Eleven

Players of the week:

Week Twelve

Players of the week:

Week Thirteen

Players of the week:

FCS playoffs

Records against other conferences

CAA vs. FCS conferences

CAA vs. FBS conferences

Attendance

References